The Shoppes at Northpark is a shopping mall  located in Oklahoma City, Oklahoma, with a concentration of high-end retail establishments.  It contains 45 tenants comprising approximately 250,000 square feet of gross space for lease.Lackmeyer, Steve (October 1, 2007). Northpark Mall Against the Odds, OKC History

Thomas Morris purchased a  tract for the mall in 1967 at $2,500-an-acre, and completed the first phase in 1973, which consisted of a  Safeway grocery store (the largest in the state at the time, no longer in business) and Northpark 4 Cinemas, becoming AMC Northpark 7 in its final form before being closed. In 1973 the new mall was located on (what was at that time) the northern edge of Oklahoma City.Nichols, Max (July 3, 1986). Morris Still Looks to Future with Northpark Mall / Northpark, Quail Plaza Emerge as Monuments to His Innovation Ahead of Crowd, The Journal RecordChambers, Kelley (June 29, 2009). These Walls: Northpark Mall in Oklahoma City, The Journal Record

It was followed by an expansion in 1977 which added  of retail space, and another expansion in 1981.  Occupancy fell to approximately 50 percent as a result of the 1980s oil bust, but subsequently improved in the mid-1990s.  The mall now consists of a number of smaller high-end retailers.Mize, Richard (October 15, 2005). Urban mall – With local ownership maintained, Northpark is rare among retail centers, The Oklahoman

References

External links
 The Shoppes at Northpark
 Northpark Mall article

Shopping malls established in 1972
Shopping malls in Oklahoma
Buildings and structures in Oklahoma City
Economy of Oklahoma City
Tourist attractions in Oklahoma City